The 2008 NACAC Cross Country Championships took place on March 1, 2008.  The races were held at the Disney's Wide World of Sports Complex in Orlando, Florida, United States.  Detailed reports of the event were given.

Complete results were published.

Medallists

Medal table (unofficial)

Note: Totals include both individual and team medals, with medals in the team competition counting as one medal.

Participation
According to an unofficial count, 64 athletes from 6 countries participated.

 (4)
 (24)
 (4)
 (16)
 (1)
 (15)

See also
 2008 in athletics (track and field)

References

NACAC Cross Country Championships
NACAC Cross Country Championships
NACAC Cross Country Championships
2008 in sports in Florida
International track and field competitions hosted by the United States
Cross country running in the United States
Cross country running in Florida